Spellerberg is a Danish surname. Notable people with the surname include:

Bo Spellerberg (born 1979), Danish handball player
Louise Spellerberg (born 1982), Danish handball player

Danish-language surnames